Matthew Francis Benson-Lidholm (born 5 March 1952) born in Albany, Western Australia is an Australian politician. He was a member of the Western Australian Legislative Council representing the Agricultural region and Deputy President of the Legislative Council. Elected to Parliament in the 2005 state election he is a member of the Labor Party.

Prior to entering parliament, Benson-Lidholm was a teacher and taught at Mount Barker Senior High School and at the school of Distance Education.

With his wife Jan, he is a prominent breeder of Rhodesian Ridgeback dogs under the Bowbridge prefix.

References

1952 births
Living people
Members of the Western Australian Legislative Council
People from Albany, Western Australia
Australian Labor Party members of the Parliament of Western Australia
21st-century Australian politicians